Lorcan or Lorcán is an Irish language male given name, meaning 'little fierce one', and may refer to:

Lorcan Allen (born 1940), Irish farmer and former Fianna Fáil Teachta Dála TD
Lorcan Cranitch (born 1959), Irish actor
Lorcan Dempsey (born 1958), the Vice President and Chief Strategist of the Online Computer Library Center (OCLC)
Lorcán mac Cellaig (flourished 848), King of Leinster of the Uí Muiredaig sept of the Uí Dúnlainge branch of the Laigin
Lorcán mac Fáelán, the seventh of ten Kings of Leinster to be inaugurated and based on Lyons Hill, Ardclough, County Kildare
Lorcán Ó Muireadais (1883–1941), Irish Roman Catholic priest, Irish language educator and nationalist activist
Lorcan O'Herlihy (born 1959), architect
Lorcán Ua Tuathail (1128–1180), Saint Laurence O'Toole, canonized in 1225 by Pope Honorius III

See also
List of Irish-language given names

Irish-language masculine given names